Gouger was an electoral district of the House of Assembly in the Australian state of South Australia from 1938 to 1977 and which was associated with the town of Balaklava.

Gouger was abolished in a boundary redistribution in 1977.

Members

Russack went to represent the Electoral district of Goyder from September 1977.

Election results

References 

Former electoral districts of South Australia
1938 establishments in Australia
1977 disestablishments in Australia